Chermahin (also Romanized as Chermahīn and Cher Mahīn; also known as Qal‘eh Charmi) is a city in Bagh-e Bahadoran District, in Lenjan County, Isfahan Province, Iran. At the 2006 census, its population was 12,292, in 3,035 families.

References

Populated places in Lenjan County

Cities in Isfahan Province